Clypeosectus is a genus of sea snails, marine gastropod mollusks in the family Lepetodrilidae.

Species
Species within the genus Clypeosectus include:

 Clypeosectus curvus McLean, 1989
 Clypeosectus delectus McLean, 1989

References

External links

Lepetodrilidae